Daniel Vasau (born 1 August 1982) is a Tongan rugby league footballer who represented Tonga at the 2000 World Cup.

Playing career
Vasau was a Richmond Bulldogs junior and won the Auckland Rugby League's best and fairest award in 2000. He was then included in the Tongan side for the 2000 World Cup. In 2001 he was promoted to play for the Marist Richmond Brothers side in the Bartercard Cup. Later that year he won a Prime Minister's scholarship to help his rugby league career.

In 2004 and 2005 he played for the North Harbour Tigers, earning selection for the NZRL's Presidents selection that played the New Zealand Warriors at North Harbour Stadium on 27 February 2005.

References

Living people
New Zealand rugby league players
Tonga national rugby league team players
1982 births
Richmond Bulldogs players
North Harbour rugby league team players
Marist Richmond Brothers players
People educated at St Paul's College, Auckland
Rugby league halfbacks